Frank Capra (May 5, 1897 – September 3, 1991) was an Italian-American film director, producer and writer who became the creative force behind some of the major award-winning films of the 1930s and 1940s. Capra directed a total of 36 feature-length films (34 of which are known to survive) and 16 documentary films during his lifetime.

His movies It's a Wonderful Life, Mr. Smith Goes to Washington, and It Happened One Night are often cited among the greatest films ever made.

The following are the films directed by Frank Capra, along with a listing of his awards.

Filmography

Films

Propaganda

Films directed by Capra nominated for Academy Awards

Awards and nominations 

American Film Institute
 Life Achievement Award (1982)

Directors Guild of America
 Best Director Nomination for A Hole in the Head (1959)
 Life Achievement Award (1959)
 Best Director Nomination for Pocketful of Miracles (1961)

Golden Globe Award
 Best Director Award for It's a Wonderful Life (1946)

Venice Film Festival
 Mussolini Cups for best foreign film Nomination for It Happened One Night (1934)
 Mussolini Cups for best foreign film Nomination for Mr. Deeds Goes to Town (1936)
 Golden Lion (1982)

American Film Institute recognition
 AFI's 100 Years... 100 Movies (10th Anniversary Edition)
 It's a Wonderful Life...# 20
 Mr. Smith Goes to Washington...# 26
 It Happened One Night...# 46
 AFI's 100 Years... 100 Cheers
 It's a Wonderful Life...# 1
 Mr. Smith Goes to Washington...# 5
 Meet John Doe...# 49
 Mr. Deeds Goes to Town...# 83
 AFI's 100 Years... 100 Laughs
 It Happened One Night...# 8
 Arsenic and Old Lace...# 30
 Mr. Deeds Goes to Town...# 70
 AFI's 100 Years... 100 Passions
 It's a Wonderful Life...# 8
 It Happened One Night...# 38
 AFI's 100 Years... 100 Heroes and Villains
 50 greatest movie heroes
 It's a Wonderful Life...George Bailey ...# 9
 Mr. Smith Goes to Washington...Jefferson Smith ...# 11
 50 greatest movie villains
 It's a Wonderful Life...Mister Potter ...# 6
 AFI's 10 Top 10
 Fantasy
 It's a Wonderful Life...# 3
 Romantic Comedies
 It Happened One Night...# 3

United States National Film Registry
 The Strong Man (1926)
 The Power of the Press (1928)
 It Happened One Night (1934)
 Lost Horizon (1937)
 Mr. Smith Goes to Washington (1939)
 Why We Fight Series of seven films (1942)
 It's a Wonderful Life (1946)

Notes 

Capra, Frank
Capra, Frank